Christ Church, Bala, is in Bala, Gwynedd, Wales.  It is an active Anglican church in the deanery of Penllyn & Edeyrnion, the archdeaconry of Wrexham, and the diocese of St Asaph.  The church was designated a Grade II listed building on 13 December 2001.

The first church to be built on the site was in 1811.  The present church was built between 1853 and 1857.  The stalls and prayer desks were designed by the Chester architect John Douglas.  By the 2000s the church building had deteriorated and between March and November 2007 repairs and restoration were carried out at a cost of £600,000.

See also
List of church restorations, amendments and furniture by John Douglas

References

External links
 Church website

Bala, Christ Church
Churches completed in 1857
19th-century Church in Wales church buildings
Bala
Gothic Revival church buildings in Wales
Christ Church
1811 establishments in Wales